Skvortzoviothrix is a genus of green algae, in the family Chaetophoraceae. , the only species is Skvortzoviothrix terrestris.

The genus was circumscribed by Pierre Paul Charles Bourrelly in Algues Eau Douce ed. 2, vol.1 on page 546 in 1972. 

The genus name of Skvortzoviothrix is in honour of Boris Vassilievich Skvortzov (1896–1980), who was a Polish-Russian-Brazilian botanist (Algology and Mycology), and teacher. He also worked as a researcher in Harbin, China.

References

Chaetophorales genera
Chaetophoraceae
Monotypic algae genera